Island single malts are the single malt Scotch whiskies produced on the islands around the perimeter of the Scottish mainland.  The islands (excluding Islay) are not recognised in the Scotch Whisky Regulations as a distinct whisky producing region, but are considered to be part of the Highland region. Islay is itself recognised as a distinct whisky producing region (see Islay whisky).

Other sources, however, indicate that the Islands, excluding Islay, constitute a sixth distinct region. This unofficial region includes the following whisky-producing islands: Arran, Jura, Mull, Orkney, and Skye: with their respective distilleries: Arran, Jura, Tobermory, Highland Park, Scapa and Talisker.

The whiskies produced on the Islands are extremely varied and have few similarities, though can often be distinguished from other whisky regions by generally having a smokier flavour with peaty undertones. One source states that the flavour depends on the use of peat which "varies widely depending on the distiller".

Island malt distilleries
 Abhainn Dearg distillery, on Lewis
 Arran distillery, on Arran
 Highland Park distillery, in Orkney
 Isle of Raasay distillery, on Raasay
 Jura distillery, on Jura
 Saxa Vord distillery, on Unst
 Scapa distillery, in Orkney
 Talisker distillery, on Skye
 Tobermory distillery, on Mull, producing Tobermory and Ledaig
 Torabhaig distillery, on Skye

In development
 Isle of Barra distillery, on Barra
 Isle of Harris distillery, on Harris, Outer Hebrides

See also
 List of whisky distilleries in Scotland

References

Scottish malt whisky